Na Cha-ang railway station is a railway station located in Na Cha-ang Subdistrict, Chumphon City, Chumphon.

Train services 
 Ordinary 254/255 Lang Suan-Thon Buri-Lang Suan

References 
 
 

Railway stations in Thailand